Jeremy Workman is an American filmmaker and editor. His documentary films frequently focus on eccentrics, outsiders, and those with extreme passions. His acclaimed films include Lily Topples The World, The World Before Your Feet, Magical Universe, and Who Is Henry Jaglom? In most of his films, Workman serves as the director, cinematographer, and editor.

Life and career
Workman's 2021 documentary, Lily Topples The World, about domino toppling artist Lily Hevesh, premiered at the 2021 SXSW Film Festival where it was awarded Grand Jury Prize for Best Documentary.  Soon after, the film won the Audience Award for Best Documentary at the 2021 San Francisco International Film Festival. Actress Kelly Marie Tran serves as an Executive Producer, which marks her producing debut. In May 2021, it was announced that the documentary was a high-profile acquisition of Discovery+. Celebrated by critics, the film garnered a "Certified Fresh" rating on Rotten Tomatoes.

Workman's 2018 documentary The World Before Your Feet premiered in competition at the 2018 SXSW Film Festival and was acquired by distributor Greenwich Entertainment.  The documentary, about Matt Green's mission to walk every street of New York City, was widely hailed upon its release. It was a New York Times Critic's Pick, a Los Angeles Times Critics Choice, and has a 100% positive rating on Rotten Tomatoes. The film also marked the producing debut of actor Jesse Eisenberg.

Workman's 2014 documentary Magical Universe was released theatrically on October 31, 2014, with IFC Films. The film is about reclusive outsider artist Al Carbee who created elaborate dioramas and collages featuring Barbie dolls. The film grew out of Workman's 2002 short film Carbee's Barbies and encompasses the final years of Carbee's life, a time when Workman was Carbee's closest friend and his only link to the outside world. The film won several film festival awards.

Workman's debut film, Who Is Henry Jaglom? (co-directed with Henry Alex Rubin) was presented at numerous film festivals before premiering on PBS's acclaimed documentary series POV. The documentary on filmmaker Henry Jaglom has a 86% positive rating on Rotten Tomatoes.

In addition to being a director, Workman is known for his film editing, primarily as a sought-after editor of movie trailers for indie and documentary films. He has edited over 100 movie trailers and frequently speaks about trailers and movie marketing to filmmakers and film communities throughout the world.

Workman was born in New York City and grew up in Los Angeles. He is the son of filmmaker/editor Chuck Workman and began editing documentary projects under his father's tutelage when he was in his teenage years. He earned a Bachelor of Arts in English Literature from Columbia University.

Filmography
 Lily Topples The World (2021)
 The World Before Your Feet (2018)
 True New York (2016)
 Magical Universe (2014)
 One Track Mind (2005)
 Who Is Henry Jaglom? (1997)

References

External links
 
 Official website
 "Top 10" with Director Jeremy Workman on Criterion Collection
 Lily Topples The World website
 The World Before Your Feet website
 Magical Universe website

American documentary filmmakers
Columbia College (New York) alumni
Film directors from New York City
Year of birth missing (living people)
Living people